The 1956 season was Dinamo București's eighth season in Divizia A. As Romanian champions, Dinamo plays in the European Cup, becoming the first Romanian team to participate in this competition. In Divizia A, Dinamo ends second place, four points behind the champions. Alexandru Ene is also second in the goalscorer's hierarchy, with 17 goals.

Results

European Cup 

On August 26, 1956, Dinamo plays their first European game. In the preliminary round, Dinamo meets Galatasaray Istanbul. The first match takes place in Bucharest, on 23 August stadium, in front of 85.000 spectators. Dinamo wins 3–1 and then they move forward after a 1–2 loss in Istanbul. In the first round, Dinamo is eliminated by CDNA Sofia.

First European match for Dinamo

The other matches in the European Cup 

Preliminary round – second leg

Dinamo București won 4–3 on aggregate.

First round – first leg

First round – second leg

CDNA Sofia won 10–4 on aggregate

Transfers 

Before the season start, Iuliu Uţu is brought from Stiinta Timişoara, for Petre Curcan. Carol Bartha is transferred to Progresul Oradea. Vasile Anghel and Ion Nunweiller are promoted from the junior team.

References 
 www.labtof.ro
 www.romaniansoccer.ro

1956
Association football clubs 1956 season
1955–56 in Romanian football
1956–57 in Romanian football